M. amurensis may refer to:
 Maackia amurensis, the Amur maackia, a tree species
 Mandschurosaurus amurensis, a dinosaur species
 Meoneura amurensis a fly species in the genus Meoneura
 Mesodineutes amurensis, an extinct beetle species
 Mordellistena amurensis, a beetle species

See also 
 List of Latin and Greek words commonly used in systematic names#Amurensis